Leah Thorvilson (born January 9, 1979) is an American racing cyclist, who currently rides for American amateur team Amy D Foundation. Thorvilson also competed as a long-distance runner, who specialized in the marathon, winning the Walt Disney World Marathon in 2011.

She grew up in Robbinsdale, Minnesota. In 2012, Thorvilson qualified to run in the US Olympic Team Marathon Trials where she finished with a time of 2:42:09. On March 4, 2012, Thorvilson won the Little Rock Marathon for the fourth year in a row with a personal best time of 2:37:26.  On April 28, 2012 Thorvilson won the Frisco Railroad Run 50-Mile Race in Willard, Missouri with a time of 6:00:31. This is the fourth-fastest 50-miler by a female ever behind only Ann Trason, Donna Perkins, and Marcy Schwam. Thorvilson now lives and trains in Little Rock, Arkansas.

In December 2016 it was announced that Thorvilson would ride for the  team for the 2017 season after emerging as the winner of the Zwift Academy program, beating 1,200 other competitors in the process.

Races 
2012 Frisco Railroad Run 50 Miler 6:00:31 (The world's fourth-fastest 50-miler by a female)
2012 US Olympic Team Marathon Trials 2:42:09
2012 Little Rock Marathon 2:37:26 *Women's Course Record, New Marathon PR
Lost Dutchman Marathon 2:47:16 *Women's Course Record
Tallahassee Marathon 2:40:06 *Women's Course Record
2011 Walt Disney World Marathon 2:42:11 *Women's Winner
2011 Midsouth Marathon 2:57:14
Great Cranberry Island 50K 3:32:00 *Women's Course Record

References 

https://www.velonews.com/2016/12/news/leah-thorvilsons-second-chance_426804

https://ualr.edu/alumni/home/connect-with-other-alumni/leah-thorvilson-03/

http://cycling.today/37-year-old-leah-thorvilson-earns-worldtour-contract-on-zwift/

https://en.wikipedia.org/wiki/Leah_Thorvilson

http://littlerockmarathon.com/marathon/

External links

1979 births
Living people
American female marathon runners
American female long-distance runners
People from Robbinsdale, Minnesota
Sportspeople from Minnesota
American female cyclists
21st-century American women